Colin Alphonsous Palmer (March 23, 1944 − June 20, 2019) was a Jamaican American historian. He was a Dodge Professor of History and African American studies at Princeton University.

Palmer was an author of several monographs pertaining to the history of diasporic Africans. His work mainly focused on the effects of the enslavement and colonization of Africans. The effects that he discusses are known as the African Diaspora
. Palmer attended the University of the West Indies for his bachelor's degree, followed by a masters and PH.D from the University of Wisconsin. He went on to teach at several institutions including Oakland University, the University of North Carolina, and the City University of New York.  One of his most notable works, Freedom's Children, contains an in-depth overview of British colonialism in Jamaica one hundred years after the ending of slavery, and is centered upon the impact that the Labour Rebellions of 1938 had on the development of working-class consciousness and the collective disposition to act. It provides insight on Alexander Bustamante's association with the imperial regime, together with demonstrating the roles that Bustamante and, his cousin, Norman Manley played in the rise of trade unions and the beginning of party politics in Jamaica. These topics are thoroughly detailed in this work, bringing the harshness of the British regime to light. Colin Palmer's works concerned the history of Blacks from several regions, including Jamaica, Mexico, America, and Africa. In addition to his books, Palmer also published academic articles in journals such as The Black Scholar. He later worked as a managing editor for the Blacks Studies Center and teaches at the University of Princeton. Palmer died in Kingston, Jamaica on June 20, 2019.

List of Works
 Inward Hunger: The Education of Prime Minister by Eric Williams (Editor) (1972)
 Slaves of the White God: Blacks in Mexico, 1570-1650 (1976)
 Human Cargoes (1981)
 Modern Caribbean (1989)
 Capitalism and Slavery by Eric Williams (Editor, with a new introduction) (1994)
 The First Passage: Blacks in the Americas 1502-1617 (1995)
 The African Diaspora (1996)
 Passageways: An Interpretive History of Black America (1998)
 The Education of History for Twenty-First Century (2003)
 Encyclopedia of African American Culture and History: The Black experience in The Americas (Encyclopedia of African American Culture and History) 6 vol. set (2005)
 Beyond Black and Red: African-Native Relations in Colonial Latin America (2005)
 Eric Williams & The Making Of The Modern Caribbean (2006)
 Ideology, Identity and Assumptions (2007)
 Cultural Life (2007)
 Cheddi Jagan and the Politics of Power: British Guiana's Struggle for Independence (2010)
 Freedom's Children: The 1983 Labor Rebellion and the Birth of Modern Jamaica (2014)

References

1944 births
2019 deaths
20th-century American historians
20th-century American male writers
21st-century American historians
21st-century American male writers
Jamaican emigrants to the United States
People from Westmoreland Parish
Princeton University faculty
University of Wisconsin–Madison alumni
American male non-fiction writers